Annie Collins is a film editor from New Zealand, best known for her work on The Return of the King. She was a film conformer on The Fellowship of the Ring, and moved up to assistant editor on The Two Towers. Her work with Jamie Selkirk (as an "additional editor") helped earn The Return of the King an Oscar for Best Editing in 2004.

Filmography 
 Solo - assistant editor, 1978
 Goodbye Pork Pie - sound editor, 1981
 Patu! - editor, 1983
 The Neglected Miracle - editor, 1985
 Mana Waka - editor, 1990
 Once Were Warriors - dialogue supervisor, 1994
 Tamaiti, O - editor, 1996
 Scarfies - editor, 1999
 The Lord of the Rings: The Fellowship of the Ring - film conformer, 2001
 The Lord of the Rings: The Two Towers - assistant editor, 2002
 Kombi Nation - editor, 2003
 The Lord of the Rings: The Return of the King - additional editor, 2003
 Out of the Blue - editor, 2006
Xmas for Lou - editor, 1992

References 

"Annie Collins Uncut", interview in Onfilm Magazine, December, 2004. Online version archived at WebCite from this original URL 2008-06-04.

Further reading
 Based on a 2009 interview.

External links 

 

New Zealand film editors
Year of birth missing (living people)
Living people